The Journal of Intellectual Property Rights  is a bimonthly peer-reviewed law journal covering intellectual property law that is published by the Indian National Institute of Science Communication and Information Resources. The journal was established in 1996 and publishes contributed and invited articles, case studies, patent reviews, technical notes on current IPR issues, literature reviews, world literature on intellectual property rights, national and international news, book reviews, and conference reports covering topics on trademarks, patents, copyright law, trade secrets, and internet law. The journal is abstracted and indexed in Scopus. The editor-in-chief is Madhu Sahni (National Institute of Science Communication and Information Resources).

See also 
 List of intellectual property law journals

External links 
 

Creative Commons Attribution-licensed journals
Intellectual property law journals
Bimonthly journals
English-language journals
National Institute of Science Communication and Information Resources academic journals
Publications established in 1996